UNITY is a programming language constructed by K. Mani Chandy and Jayadev Misra for their book Parallel Program Design: A Foundation. It is a theoretical language which focuses on what, instead of where, when or how. The language contains no method of flow control, and program statements run in a nondeterministic way until statements cease to cause changes during execution. This allows for programs to run indefinitely, such as auto-pilot or power plant safety systems, as well as programs that would normally terminate (which here converge to a fixed point).

Description 

All statements are assignments, and are separated by #. A statement can consist of multiple assignments, of the form a,b,c := x,y,z, or a := x || b := y || c := z. You can also have a quantified statement list, <# x,y : expression :: statement>, where x and y are chosen randomly among the values that satisfy expression. A quantified assignment is similar. In <|| x,y : expression :: statement >, statement is executed simultaneously for all pairs of x and y that satisfy expression.

Examples

Bubble sort

Bubble sort the array by comparing adjacent numbers, and swapping them if they are in the wrong order. Using  expected time,  processors and  expected work. This can be fixed by flipping k manually.

 Program bubblesort
 declare
     n: integer,
     A: array [0..n-1] of integer
 initially
     n = 20 #
     <|| i : 0 <= i and i < n :: A[i] = rand() % 100 >
 assign
     <# k : 0 <= k < 2 ::
         <|| i : i % 2 = k and 0 <= i < n - 1 ::
             A[i], A[i+1] := A[i+1], A[i] 
                 if A[i] > A[i+1] > >
 end

Rank-sort

You can sort in  time with rank-sort. You need  processors, and do  work.

 Program ranksort
 declare
     n: integer,
     A,R: array [0..n-1] of integer
 initially
     n = 15 #
     <|| i : 0 <= i < n :: 
         A[i], R[i] = rand() % 100, i >
 assign
     <|| i : 0 <= i < n ::
         R[i] := <+ j : 0 <= j < n and (A[j] < A[i] or (A[j] = A[i] and j < i)) :: 1 > >
     #
     <|| i : 0 <= i < n ::
         A[R[i]] := A[i] >
 end

Floyd–Warshall algorithm

Using the Floyd–Warshall algorithm all pairs shortest path algorithm, we include intermediate nodes iteratively, and get  time, using  processors and  work.

 Program shortestpath
 declare
     n,k: integer,
     D: array [0..n-1, 0..n-1] of integer
 initially
     n = 10 #
     k = 0 #
     <|| i,j : 0 <= i < n and 0 <= j < n :: 
         D[i,j] = rand() % 100 >
 assign
     <|| i,j : 0 <= i < n and 0 <= j < n ::
         D[i,j] := min(D[i,j], D[i,k] + D[k,j]) > ||
     k := k + 1 if k < n - 1
 end

We can do this even faster. The following programs computes all pairs shortest path in  time, using  processors and  work.

 Program shortestpath2
 declare
     n: integer,
     D: array [0..n-1, 0..n-1] of integer
 initially
     n = 10 #
     <|| i,j : 0 <= i < n and 0 <= j < n ::
         D[i,j] = rand() % 10 >
 assign
     <|| i,j : 0 <= i < n and 0 <= j < n ::
         D[i,j] := min(D[i,j], <min k : 0 <= k < n :: D[i,k] + D[k,j] >) >
 end

In the next round, of length , and so on.

References
 K. Mani Chandy and Jayadev Misra (1988) Parallel Program Design: A Foundation.

Experimental programming languages